Juan Guerra (born 13 April 1927, date of death unknown) was a Bolivian footballer who played as a defender for Bolivia in the 1950 FIFA World Cup. Guerra is deceased.

Club career
Guerra also played for Ferroviario La Paz.

References

External links
FIFA profile

1927 births
Year of death missing
Footballers from La Paz
Bolivian footballers
Bolivia international footballers
Association football forwards
1950 FIFA World Cup players